Kealoha Pilares (born February 20, 1988) is a former American football wide receiver. He was drafted by the Carolina Panthers in the fifth round of the 2011 NFL Draft. He played college football at the University of Hawaii at Manoa.

Professional career
In the 2011 NFL Draft, Pilares was selected in the fifth round, 132nd overall, by the Carolina Panthers. On November 20, 2011, he set a franchise record (since broken) with a 101-yard kick return for a touchdown against the Detroit Lions.

On August 24, 2013, he was placed on injured reserve. He was released on August 24, 2014.

Professional statistics

References

External links
Hawaii Warriors bio 

1988 births
Living people
American football wide receivers
Canadian football wide receivers
American players of Canadian football
Carolina Panthers players
Damien Memorial School alumni
Hamilton Tiger-Cats players
Hawaii Rainbow Warriors football players
Players of American football from Honolulu
Players of Canadian football from Honolulu